The 2013 Tour de France was the 100th Tour de France. It ran from 29 June 2013 to 21 July 2013, starting in the city of Porto-Vecchio in Corsica, with the island hosting the first three stages. Corsica was the only Metropolitan region, and Corse-du-Sud and Haute-Corse were the only Metropolitan departments, through which the Tour had never previously passed and the organisers wanted to combine the 100th edition of the Tour with the Tour's first ever visit to Corsica.

The opening stage was a standard road stage rather than the more usual Individual time trial or "Prologue".

To accommodate the tour entourage during their stay in Corsica, the organisers chartered the Mega Smeralda cruiseferry to house members of the organisation, media and others who work on the Tour and to host press conferences, although the riders stayed in hotels in and around Porto-Vecchio.

Stage 1

29 June 2013 — Porto-Vecchio to Bastia, 

The first stage of the race was a relatively flat stage on the east coast of Corsica and was expected to end with a sprint finish, with Mark Cavendish looking to claim the sprint and with it the maillot jaune for the overall race leader.

The peloton did not allow them very much lead, as the mostly -paced main field kept the time gap between two and three minutes for the majority of the stage. The fourth-category Cote de Sotta came at the  mark in the stage, the only climb on the day's parcours. This meant that the first rider, from the breakaway, over the line would be the first holder of the polka-dot jersey. It was Lobato who crossed first, beating out Cousin and Boom, and Lobato pulled on the climber's jersey at day's end.

At that point the breakaway sat up (stopped riding hard) and attempted to rejoin the peloton behind them, since the stage's flat profile (and its prestige) meant it was extremely unlikely they could stay away for victory. The time gap got to as little as 39 seconds before eventually getting as high again as four minutes. After both the break and the peloton had passed through the feeding station, it was again reduced to 40 seconds. Four of the riders again looked to sit up and abandon their efforts, but Cousin continued to ride, and eventually so did the whole breakaway group. For these efforts, Cousin was awarded the daily combativity award at stage's end. The time gap then got as large as four minutes, allowing the breakaway to contest the intermediate sprint as well. This one went to Boom ahead of Flecha. A few minutes later, three of the Tour's top sprinters André Greipel, Mark Cavendish, and Peter Sagan sprinted for the points available to them, coming across the line in that very order. The breakaway were at last caught with  remaining in the stage, and the teams set up for the anticipated sprint finale.

It was about this time that reports came through of a problem at the finish line – a bus for the  team had become stuck under the finishing arch. It was too tall to pass through. It disrupted the electronic timing for the stage, but the more pressing problem was the fact that the finish line was not clear to be covered by the cyclists. Race officials tried to extricate the bus, having no success for several minutes as the riders came nearer and nearer to the finish line. Around this same time, the day's first major crash occurred, sending, among numerous others, 2012 Giro d'Italia champion Ryder Hesjedal off his bicycle.

It was at this point that the bus was successfully removed from under the finishing arch, so race officials chose to move the stage finish back to the original finishing line. Also at this point, a crash of tremendous scope thinned the possible stage winners substantially, as sprinters Sagan, Cavendish, and Matthew Goss all either fell themselves or were caught behind the crash. Greipel, for his part, managed to stay upright and at the front of the race through both crashes, but a mechanical issue ended his chances at a stage victory and a yellow jersey. His German compatriot, 24-year-old Marcel Kittel from the  team, was the rider who profited from the day's chaos and took stage honours, with the yellow, green, and white jerseys to go with it. No time gaps were taken on the stage – all 197 other riders in the field were given the same time as Kittel. Along with sprinters who missed out on the possibility at a stage win, some overall contenders and noteworthy stage-hunters also crashed. Alberto Contador crashed, and while his injuries were not severe enough to force him to retire from the race, he did express concern that they might keep him from being able to ride in optimal position for the upcoming team time trial. Tony Martin and Ted King sustained perhaps the worst injuries of anyone; Martin sustained a concussion and a lung contusion to go along with soft tissue damage and a deep shoulder wound, and King suffered a badly bruised and possibly broken shoulder. Tejay van Garderen, Philippe Gilbert, Gert Steegmans, Janez Brajkovič, Tony Gallopin, and Murilo Fischer all also crashed. Geraint Thomas also crashed, suffering a hairline fracture to his pelvis in the incident.

After the stage, Cavendish,  rider Greg Henderson, and  team boss Marc Madiot all expressed their displeasure with race officials for moving the finish back to the original line while the teams were at sprint speed racing for the supposed finish at the  banner. Henderson's criticisms focused on the effects the rapid changes had on the competitive aspect of the race, while Cavendish and Madiot were more concerned with how they affected rider safety.  were fined 2,000 Swiss francs for "not respecting the timetable put in place for auxiliary team vehicles arriving at the stage finish" as a result of the incident. For his part, stage winner Kittel claimed not to have heard the instructions over race radio for the revised finish at the  banner, which would seem to have played a part in his being focused to ride hard for the original finish line and take the day's honours.

Stage 2

30 June 2013 — Bastia to Ajaccio, 

The tour crossed the island to Ajaccio on the west coast, with four ranked climbs including the Category 2 Col de Vizzavona after  and a Category 3 climb  before the finish.

The day started with an opening attack within the opening kilometre and the formation of the day's breakaway by the  mark. Boom crossed the intermediate sprint point ahead of his breakaway compatriots, while André Greipel lead the peloton across the same point, beating 's Peter Sagan. The four breakaway riders started the climb of the Col de Bellagranajo with a 1' 50" advantage that was cut to a 1' 00" advantage at the summit of the climb.

Veilleux and Kadri broke away from their companions at the start of the second climb while Veilleux's team-mate Thomas Voeckler attacked from the peloton, but was quickly brought back. At this point, a gruppetto was forming which included the yellow jersey Marcel Kittel as well as the other top sprinters in the tour. Pierre Rolland attacked from the peloton and was followed by 's Brice Feillu. The leading peloton picked off members of the breakaway one by one, until only Bakelants remained. Bakelants finished across the line a second in front of Sagan, earning himself his first Tour stage victory and the yellow jersey.

Stage 3

1 July 2013 — Ajaccio to Calvi, 

The third and final day on Corsica saw the race return northwards again along the rugged west coast with several small climbs including the short but steep climb of the Category 2 Col de Marsolino,  before the finish in Calvi. Simon Gerrans won the stage.

Stage 4

2 July 2013 — Nice to Nice,  team time trial (TTT)

The first stage on mainland France was a team time trial, in which each team's time was taken when their fifth rider crosses the line. The race commenced in the Jardin Albert I and looped around the streets of Nice until reaching the Promenade des Anglais after . The route then followed the seafront for  before turning north at Nice Côte d'Azur Airport to follow the Var valley.

American cyclist Ted King, who was nursing a shoulder injury, was controversially eliminated from the tour after riding on his own using a standard road bike (rather than a time trial bike) and finishing seven seconds outside the cutoff time. Many felt that race officials should have taken account of his courage in completing the stage and allowed him to continue the tour.

Stage 5

3 July 2013 — Cagnes-sur-Mer to Marseille, 

The fifth stage took the riders westwards through Provence, crossing four small categorised climbs before reaching the port of Marseille, finishing at Parc Borély, to the south of the city centre. Mark Cavendish won the stage which was the 24th Tour de France stage victory of his career.

Stage 6

4 July 2013 — Aix-en-Provence to Montpellier, 

The race continued westwards through southern France into Languedoc. The stage was won by André Greipel in a sprint finish.

Stage 7

5 July 2013 — Montpellier to Albi, 

This stage took the riders north-west through the Monts de Lacaune including the climbs of the Col des 13 Vents ("The Pass of 13 Winds") and the Category 2 Col de la Croix de Mounis. After passing the town of Lacaune, the race dropped down over two smaller climbs before the finish in the World Heritage Site city of Albi. Peter Sagan won the stage in a sprint finish.

Stage 8
6 July 2013 — Castres to Ax 3 Domaines, 

The first rider to cross the summit, 's Nairo Quintana won the Souvenir Henri Desgrange. The final climb saw the GC contenders come to the front in this tour's first battle for the maillot jaune.

Johnny Hoogerland attacked as soon as the flag was dropped and was quickly joined by three other riders: Jean-Marc Marino, Christophe Riblon, and Rudy Molard. Back in the peloton, André Greipel took the sprint honors ahead of Peter Sagan and Mark Cavendish.

The race soon reached the base of the Port de Pailhères with the leading group only holding an advantage of under two minutes. Riblon then launched an attack of his own and built a sizable lead over his former escape companions. Robert Gesink was the first rider to attack from the peloton and was followed by an attack from Thomas Voeckler. At this point, yellow jersey holder Daryl Impey was dropped.

Pierre Rolland and Igor Antón attempted to follow, but Quintana built and advantage of 55 seconds over the chasing group at the top of the climb. Rolland would catch Quintana on the bottom of the descent, but was quickly dropped as the riders began the ascent up to Ax 3 Domaines. Riders were continuously shelled from the back of the chasing group until only five riders remained with under  to go:  riders Chris Froome and Richie Porte, Quintana's team-mate Alejandro Valverde and  pairing Alberto Contador and Roman Kreuziger. Porte and Froome, having built a small gap over the other three riders, soon caught Quintana; thus prompting Froome to launch an attack of his own up the mountain. Froome gradually built a larger advantage all the way to the finish line and into the yellow jersey. Behind, Valverde attempted to chase after Froome, before being passed by Porte who comfortably rode into second place. Contador and Kreuziger struggled behind and were passed by  duo Bauke Mollema and Laurens ten Dam, and 's Mikel Nieve.

Stage 9
7 July 2013 — Saint-Girons to Bagnères-de-Bigorre, 

The second stage in the Pyrenees saw the race cross the Category 2 Col de Portet d'Aspet soon after the start, followed by four Category 1 climbs: Col de Menté, Col de Peyresourde, Col de Val Louron-Azet and La Hourquette d'Ancizan. This is a "roller-coaster" stage.

Following Froome and Team Sky's dominating performance at Ax 3 Domaines, Movistar and Garmin attacked from the early stages. Although Chris Froome was able to follow the attacks, Richie Porte's efforts caused him to be dropped by the leaders and eventually lose 10 minutes. As a result, Froome was left isolated for the majority of the stage, having to hold off several attacks from Nairo Quintana on the final climb. A late attack on the final climb by Jakob Fuglsang and Dan Martin was allowed to escape, and the Irish rider held off Fuglsang to win the stage. The rest of the leading riders, minus Porte, finished in a group behind Martin.

Stage 10

9 July 2013 — Saint-Gildas-des-Bois to Saint-Malo,

Stage 11

10 July 2013 — Avranches to Mont Saint-Michel, individual time trial (ITT)

References

2013 Tour de France
Tour de France stages